Knezovljani is a village in the Donji Kukuruzari municipality of central Croatia. It is connected by the D30 highway. According to the 2011 census, there was a total of 81 inhabitants.

History
The village was part of the Republic of Serbian Krajina during the Croatian War (1991–95).

Demographic history
According to the 1991 census, there was a total of 177 inhabitants, out of whom Serbs were majority 171 (96.61%), with  Croats 2 (1.12%), and others 4 (2.25%).

References

Populated places in Sisak-Moslavina County
Serb communities in Croatia